The Roman Catholic Archdiocese of Kaduna {Kadunaën(sis)  in Latin} is the Metropolitan See for the Ecclesiastical province of Kaduna in Nigeria.

History
 1911.08.24: The Apostolic Prefecture of Eastern Nigeria was created from the Apostolic Prefecture of Upper Niger and it had Shendam as its headquarters. Kano, afterwards a principal mission station under Kaduna, was opened from Shendam but Kaduna itself was administered from Asaba (headquarters of the Prefecture of Upper Niger which subsequently became the Vicariate Apostolic of Western Nigeria.
 1929.07.18: Renamed as Apostolic Prefecture of Northern Nigeria
 1934.04.09: Renamed as Apostolic Prefecture of Kaduna 
 1953.06.29: Promoted as Diocese of Kaduna
 1959.07.16: Promoted as Metropolitan Archdiocese of Kaduna

Special churches
The seat of the archbishop is St. Joseph’s Cathedral in Kaduna.

Bishops
 Prefect Apostolic of Eastern Nigeria (Roman rite) 
 Osvaldo Waller, S.M.A. 1912 – 1929
 Prefects Apostolic of Northern Nigeria (Roman rite)
 Francis O' Rourke, S.M.A. 1929.05.17 - 1930.03.27, appointed (titular bishop and) Vicar Apostolic of Costa di Benin
 William Thomas Porter, S.M.A. 1930.04.08 – 1933.04.25, appointed (titular bishop and) Vicar Apostolic of Costa d’Oro {Gold Coast}, Ghana; future Archbishop
 Thomas Hughes, S.M.A. 1934.04.09 – 1943.01.12, appointed (titular bishop and) Vicar Apostolic of Ondo-Ilorin 
 John MacCarthy, S.M.A. 1943.05.14 – 1953.06.29 see below
 Bishop of Kaduna (Roman rite) 
 Bishop John MacCarthy, S.M.A. see above 1953.06.29 – 1959.07.16 see below
  Archbishops of Kaduna (Roman rite)
 Archbishop John MacCarthy, S.M.A. see above 1959.07.16 – 1975.06.12
 Archbishop Peter Yariyok Jatau 1975.04.10 - 2007.11.16
 Archbishop Matthew Man-oso Ndagoso, appointed 2007.11.16

Coadjutor Archbishop
Peter Yariyok Jatau (1972-1975)

Other priests of this diocese who became bishops
Joseph Danlami Bagobiri, appointed Bishop of Kafanchan in 1995
Matthew Hassan Kukah, appointed Bishop of Sokoto in 2011
Julius Yakubu Kundi, appointed Bishop of Kafanchan in 2000

Suffragan Dioceses
 Kafanchan 
 Kano 
 Kontagora 
 Minna 
 Sokoto 
 Zaria

Persecution and insecurity 
The Archdiocese of Kaduna has had several incidents of persecution, including kidnappings and murder of priests. In 2022 three priests were kidnapped at the same time, one of whom, Fr Joseph Batko, was killed. The other two, Fr Vitus Borogo and Fr Abraham Kunat were eventually released. A fourth priest, Fr John Bako Shekwolo has been missing since March 2019. Reacting to the general atmosphere of insecurity in the country, Kaduna bishop Matthew Manoso Ndagoso, said: “The political will is not there to address the issues of security in this country. The Nigerian security forces have proven they are capable, our military can do this, so that this is happening in our country shows that something has gone wrong. We have nobody else to blame but the Government. They tell us they are on top of the situation, but we think the situation is on top of them."

Regarding the murders and kidnappings of priests in Nigeria, the same bishop said, in another interview, "everybody is on edge. All of us, the clergy, the laypeople, everybody. People are afraid, and rightly so. People are traumatised, and rightly so. With this situation, nobody is safe anywhere. If you go out of your house, even in the daytime, until you come back, you are not safe”.

Speaking to Aid to the Church in Need in July, Bishop Ndagoso decried the insecurity in the following words: "In the last three years, seven of my priests have been kidnapped, two have been killed, and one has been in captivity for three years and two months. Four were released. In fifty of my parishes, priests cannot stay in their rectories, because they are targets, they are seen as an easy source of money for ransom. I cannot go on pastoral visits like I usually do, priests cannot go to villages and say masses. People cannot go to farm, so they cannot feed themselves. With this insecurity people are starved of the sacraments".

See also
 Roman Catholicism in Nigeria

References

Sources
 GCatholic.org

Roman Catholic dioceses in Nigeria
Kaduna
Roman Catholic Ecclesiastical Province of Kaduna